Sóng Thần station is a railway station on the North–South railway (Reunification Express) in Vietnam. It serves Thủ Đức city in Hồ Chí Minh City.

Transport in Ho Chi Minh City
Railway stations in Vietnam
Buildings and structures in Ho Chi Minh City